If the Sun Rises in the West is a 1998 South Korean film, and was the commercial directorial debut of Lee Eun.

Plot 
Beom-soo is a traffic control officer who aspires to become a baseball umpire. By chance he meets Hyun-joo, a theatre major who crashes her car into a tree while he is on duty. Instead of fining her, Beom-soo gives her driving lessons and they soon become friends, exchanging letters with each other when Hyun-joo returns to university. When they next meet in person Beom-soo declares his love for her, only for Hyun-joo to reject him as she plans to go overseas to study.

Three years later, Beom-soo is making his debut as a professional baseball umpire, and his feelings of love are reignited when he realises that up-and-coming actress Yoo Ha-rin is none other than Hyun-joo. The two are eventually reunited via the baseball field and resume their relationship, though Hyun-joo's affections are also pursued by Ji-min, the president of an advertising company for which she has appeared in a series of commercials. Hyun-joo eventually rejects Ji-min and shows up at the opening game of the Korean Series to throw the first ball, where she kisses Beom-soo in the middle of the field.

Cast 
 Im Chang-jung ... Beom-soo
 Ko So-young ... Hyun-joo/Yoo Ha-rin
 Cha Seung-won ... Ji-min
 Nam Hyeon-ju
 Myung Gye-nam
 Kang Chung-sik
 Park Yong-soo
 Yu Hyeong-gwan
 Lee Du-il
 Choi Yong-min
 Lee Beom-soo

Release 
If the Sun Rises in the West opened in South Korea on 19 December 1998, and received a total of 145,752 admission in Seoul.

Critical response 
Andrew Saroch of Far East Films compared the film favourably to Richard Curtis' Notting Hill, and said, "[If the Sun Rises in the West] accomplishes its modest directives and creates two characters we quickly warm to throughout their moments together. Lee Eun utilises tried-and-tested genre techniques, but it is hard to be too resistant to these when the story moves along so effortlessly." He also praised lead actress Ko So-young, saying that she "illuminates this popularist fable and lends her character some much needed humanity."

References

External links 
 
 

1998 films
1998 romantic comedy films
1990s sports comedy films
South Korean romantic comedy films
South Korean baseball films
Myung Films films
1990s Korean-language films
1998 directorial debut films